Lang Suan railway station is a railway station located in Khan Ngoen Subdistrict, Lang Suan District, Chumphon. Train services from Thon Buri railway station reach the furthest extent here. The station opened in July 1917.

Services 
 Special Express 43/44 Bangkok-Surat Thani-Bangkok
 Rapid 171/172 Bangkok-Sungai Kolok-Bangkok
 Rapid 169/170 Bangkok-Yala-Bangkok
 Rapid 173/174 Bangkok-Nakhon Si Thammarat-Bangkok
 Rapid 167/168 Bangkok-Kantang-Bangkok
 Express 85/86 Bangkok-Nakhon Si Thammarat-Bangkok
 Special Express 39/40 Bangkok-Surat Thani-Bangkok
 Special Express 41/42 Bangkok-Yala-Bangkok
 Ordinary 254/255 Lang Suan-Thon Buri-Lang Suan
 Rapid 177/178 Thon Buri-Lang Suan-Thon Buri
 Local 445/446 Chumphon-Hat Yai Junction-Chumphon

References 
 
 
 
 
 
 

Railway stations in Thailand
Chumphon province
Railway stations opened in 1917
1917 establishments in Siam